The Moon and Other Lovers is a 2008 German tragicomic film written and directed by Bernd Böhlich. It was entered into the 30th Moscow International Film Festival.

Cast
 Katharina Thalbach as Hanna Lottner
 Fritzi Haberlandt as Daniela 'Dani'
 Birol Ünel as Gansar
 Steffen Scheumann as Knuti
 Andreas Schmidt as Siggi

References

External links
  
 

2008 films
2008 comedy-drama films
2000s German-language films
German comedy-drama films
2008 comedy films
2008 drama films
2000s German films